The Tasmanian Government Railways G class was a class of  steam locomotives operated by the Tasmanian Government Railways.

History
In 1896, the Tasmanian Government Railways purchased two  steam locomotives from Sharp, Stewart and Company, Glasgow to operate the North East Dundas Tramway. Shortly after entering service, G1 was destroyed on 17 May 1897 after the boiler exploded. The crew were killed and the boiler flung 30 metres into the air landing 230 metres away. A replacement arrived in 1900, assuming G1's identity. After the railway closed, both were sold to the Isis Sugar Mill in Cordalba, Queensland and converted to tender locomotives'.

G1 ended up in a Childers service station, but has since disappeared, while G2 was sold for use at a planned Sydney theme park, but illegally cut up at St Marys in 1991.

Namesake
The G class designation was reused for the Australian Standard Garratt locomotives in the 1940s.

References

Railway locomotives introduced in 1896
Sharp Stewart locomotives
Steam locomotives of Tasmania
0-4-2T locomotives
2 ft gauge locomotives